Concert for George is a 2003 British documentary film directed by David Leland that covers the events of the Concert for George, a tribute concert for George Harrison held at the Royal Albert Hall in London on 29 November 2002.

Overview
A benefit for Harrison's Material World Charitable Foundation, the all-star concert took place on the day of the first anniversary of his death. Proceeds from the film also went to the Material World Charitable Foundation. The film was shot using discreet cameras from over twelve locations.

Release
The film was released theatrically in Los Angeles, New York and other select locations on 3 October 2003, and was then released in the UK on 10 October. Following its release on DVD in November 2003, the film won the Best Long Form Video Grammy in 2005. One disc of the double DVD set is the theatrical version of Leland's film, while the other is the complete concert.

The film was re-released on Blu-ray as a special two-disc set on 22 March 2012.

In 2018 the film was reissued along with an album as part of Harrison's 75th birthday celebration.

Reception
At Metacritic, Concert for George received a score of 82 out of 100, based on ten reviews, indicating "universal acclaim".

Cast
Eric Clapton: Himself / Musical director (concert)
George Harrison: Himself (archive footage, uncredited)
Gary Brooker: Himself
Joe Brown: Himself
Sam Brown: Herself
Jim Capaldi: Himself
Carol Cleveland: Herself / Best girl
Ray Cooper: Himself / Producer (film)
Andy Fairweather-Low: Himself
Terry Gilliam: Himself / Barber / Mountie
Tom Hanks: Himself / Mountie
Dhani Harrison: Himself
Olivia Harrison: Herself / Producer (film)
Jools Holland: Himself
Eric Idle: Himself / Barber / Mountie
Neil Innes: Himself / Barber
Terry Jones: Himself / Barber / Mountie
Jeff Lynne: Himself / Concert audio producer (concert)
Paul McCartney: Himself
Michael Palin: Himself / Bevis
Tom Petty and the Heartbreakers: Themselves
Billy Preston: Himself
Anoushka Shankar: Herself
Ravi Shankar: Himself
Ringo Starr: Himself

Awards
2005 Grammy Award for Best Long Form Music Video

Certifications

References

External links
 

2003 films
2003 documentary films
British documentary films
Concert films
George Harrison
Films directed by David Leland
Eric Clapton video albums
Films set in England
Films shot in England
Grammy Award for Best Long Form Music Video
The Beatles in film
2000s English-language films
2000s British films
English-language documentary films